Ronald Jay Bath (born November 4, 1944) is a retired United States Air Force major general who directed U.S. Air Force Strategic Planning for the service's Deputy Chief of Staff for Plans and Programs at service headquarters in the Pentagon.

Bath's prior assignment was as director, Quadrennial Defense Review and Defense Integration. The Defense Integration Office was established to prepare and represent the Air Force in the QDR and the follow-on actions, including the Defense Planning Guidance within the Office of the U.S. Secretary of Defense.

Career
Bath began his military career in 1968 as a boiler operator and heating specialist in the enlisted ranks of the Nevada Air National Guard. During the 1997 QDR, he was the Air National Guard assistant to the director for the Air Force effort. Bath was one of 16 senior military officers representing the four services and the single National Guard officer assigned as professional staff to the 1995 congressionally mandated Commission on Roles and Missions of the Armed Forces. Having been a traditional guardsman and air technician, Bath is a command pilot with more than 3,500 flying hours in the RF-101 and RF-4 Phantom II. He flew 31 combat missions in Operation Desert Storm, during the Persian Gulf War.

Assignments
 June 1969June 1970: student, Undergraduate Pilot Training, Vance Air Force Base, Oklahoma
 June 1970July 1984: RF-101 reconnaissance pilot, 192nd Tactical Reconnaissance Squadron, Reno, Nevada
 July 1984November 1990: RF-4C pilot and flight commander, 192nd Tactical Reconnaissance Squadron, Reno, Nevada
 November 1990July 1991: flight safety officer, 35th Tactical Fighter Wing, Sheik Isa Air Base, Bahrain
 July 1991July 1993: Chief of Safety, later, Chief of Plans, 152nd Tactical Reconnaissance Group, Reno, Nevada
 July 1993July 1994: National Security Fellow, John F. Kennedy School of Government, Harvard University, Cambridge, Massachusetts
 July 1994July 1995: professional staff, Commission on Roles and Missions of the Armed Forces, Washington, D.C.
 July 1995July 1996: Air National Guard adviser to the Army Division Redesign Study, Washington, D.C.
 July 1996December 1997: Air National Guard assistant to the Director, Air Force QDR, Headquarters U.S. Air Force, Washington, D.C.
 December 1997December 1999: Division Chief, National Defense Review, Directorate of Air Force Strategic Planning and Programming, Headquarters U.S. Air Force, Washington, D.C.
 December 1999September 2001: Deputy Director, Air Force QDR, Headquarters U.S. Air Force, Washington, D.C.
 September 2001March 2002: Director, Air Force QDR and Defense Integration, Office of the Special Assistant to the Deputy Chief of Staff for Plans and Programs, Headquarters U.S. Air Force, Washington, D.C.
 March 2002May 2006: Director, Air Force Strategic Planning, Deputy Chief of Staff for Plans and Programs, Headquarters U.S. Air Force, Washington, D.C.

Flight information
Rating: Command pilot
Flight hours: More than 3,500
Aircraft flown: T-41, T-37, T-38, F-101, RF-101, C-54, F-4 and RF-4

Awards and decorations

Dates of rank

Education
1968: B.S., business and agriculture, University of Nevada, Reno
1971: MBA, University of Nevada, Reno
1975: J.D., McGeorge School of Law, University of the Pacific, Sacramento, California
1982: Air Command and Staff College, by seminar
1993: Air War College, by correspondence
1994: National Security Fellow, John F. Kennedy School of Government, Harvard University, Cambridge, Massachusetts
2014:  Associate of Applied Science in Welding Technology, Truckee Meadows Community College, Reno, Nevada

Personal life
Bath retired in November 2007 and formed the RJBath Group, specializing in classified and unclassified defense analysis consulting.

References

External links
 
 RJBath Group

1944 births
United States Air Force personnel of the Gulf War
Harvard Kennedy School people
Living people
McGeorge School of Law alumni
Recipients of the Air Medal
Recipients of the Defense Superior Service Medal
Recipients of the Distinguished Flying Cross (United States)
Recipients of the Air Force Distinguished Service Medal
United States Air Force generals
University of Nevada, Reno alumni